The Port of Kiliya is a river port of the Ust-Danube Commercial Seaport. It is located on the 47-km section of the Kiliya estuary of the Danube River, in the city of Kiliya. The length of the berth front is 150 m, the depth of the berths is 4 m.

History
The port was founded in the late 19th century, during the active development of the Port of Odessa. Currently, the port specializes in handling bulk cargo, including grain, which is exported to the Middle East and the Mediterranean. The port has a grain processing complex, equipped warehouses, both indoor (960 m2) and open (17.6 thousand m2). The port has a shipyard with 50 years of experience in the field of shipbuilding, which produces all types of supplies and services for ships of both sea and river fleets.

See also

List of ports in Ukraine
Transport in Ukraine
Cargo Turnover of Ukrainian Ports

References

Buildings and structures in Odesa Oblast
Ports of Odesa Oblast
Danube
River ports of Ukraine
Transport in Kiliya